Anak Halal is a Malaysian Malay-language action thriller film directed by Osman Ali. It was released on 13 December 2007.

Plot
The film starts with Hisham, who is a wanted criminal. In a frenzy to save his son's life, he begged a mentally ill woman named Mariam, who lived in hallway, to adopt his son. Hisham was captured by the police after a shootout. Mariam ended up raising the child and named him, Inderaputera. They lived in the slums, neighboring Bu Leha and his daughter, Johanna (Jo), a tomboy girl, who secretly loves Putera. Putera was miserable while being raised by Miriam. He finally felt euphoric when the authorities separated him from Miriam. 
 
Putera was raised by Bu Leha, who took Putra and Jo moved to Kuala Lumpur in the hope their lives will be better. They grew up  as homeless youth. While Putra had to work in a garage, Jo and her mother had to sell fruits at Chow Kit Market for a living. Meanwhile, Erzan and Milya were also among the close friends of Putera and Jo. They earn a living by hawking burgers. Together, Danial and Shah, deal with painful bitterness of life in the city.

Amira Atikah, a teenage girl who had problems with drugs, is present in their lives. Her presence gave a new color for the prince, who first wanted to know what the meaning of love was. Erzan was situated of uncertainty when the family had to bear the burden of debt from Tajul. He often interrupted by assistant Tajul that Jeff and Lut. Action Erzan who had drug trafficking to settle family debts by Tajul. This makes the Putra outraged by the actions of Erzan. The situation became alarmed when Tajul got to know the things that were taken by Ijam to be distributed have been taken. Tajul hunts down to Ijam and Erzan and kill Ijam. Tajul ask Erzan to provide all the available drugs in stock.

On a day when Erzan returned the drugs, he was shot dead by Jeff and Lut. Putra and Shah pursued them but were unsuccessful. Drastic measures were taken by the Putera after the death of Amira Atikah due to drug abuse. He decided to hunt Tajul and his friends for revenge afterwards because his friends died. As a result, Jeff was stabbed to death by Milya and Putera attacked them until he went to Tajul's residence. Hisham, who was released from prison and still continue in the dark, told Tajul spend what he has started. Tajul managed to caught Putera but was shot dead by Johanna. After finding the adventurer who led his life chaos, he finally meet with his father, Hisham and his adoptive mother, Mariam. The meeting was finally brought tragedy when Putera shots his own father. They were running away after Lut bring more people to hunt Putera with friends. Putera, Mariam and his friends escape and finally they were imprisoned by the police.

Cast
 Farid Kamil as Inderaputra
 Maya Karin as Johanna
 Fasha Sandha as Amira Atikah
 Adi Putra as Erzan
 Bront Palarae as Daniel 
 Remy Ishak as Shah
 Raja Farah as Milya
 Zul Huzaimy as Tajul
 Fauzi Nawawi as Jeff 
 Fizz Fairuz as Lut
 Jehan Miskin as Ijam
 Rosyam Nor as Hisyam
 Mislina Mustaffa as Mariam
 Kartina Aziz as Bu Leha
 Aziz Sattar as Pak Ali 
 Ahmad Tarmimi Siregar as Datuk Farid

References

External links
 

2007 action thriller films
2007 crime thriller films
2007 films
Films about drugs
Films about revenge
Films directed by Osman Ali
Films produced by Gayatri Su-Lin Pillai
Malay-language films
Malaysian action thriller films
Tayangan Unggul films